Pan Am Cargo or Clipper Cargo was a subsidiary cargo airline of Pan American World Airways. Pan Am Cargo first used piston-engined aircraft such as the Douglas DC-4. On 5 January 1952 the larger DC-6 model was used on the company's first transatlantic all-cargo service. In 1963, Pan Am's all-cargo jet service began in 1963 with Boeing 707-321Cs that henceforth dominated Pan Am's freight operations.

Pan Am stopped Pan Am Cargo operations in 1983.

Fleet
As of its end in 1983, Pan Am Cargo fleet included:
 4 Boeing 727  (1 in Mexico City)
 2 Boeing 747-123F
 2 Boeing 747-221F
 1 Boeing 747-273C (Leased from World Airways)

See also 
 List of defunct airlines of the United States

References

Pan Am
Defunct cargo airlines
Defunct airlines of the United States